Maybe It's Me is an American television sitcom that aired on The WB network. It premiered on October 5, 2001, and ended on May 3, 2002. The series was created and executive produced by Suzanne Martin, a former writer of Frasier and Ellen.

Premise
The series was centered on the life of teenager Molly Stage (Reagan Dale Neis) and her eccentric and often-embarrassing family, including her parents (insanely frugal mom, played by Julia Sweeney, and soccer-obsessed dad, played by Fred Willard), her two older brothers, her little twin sisters, and her grandparents.

Over the course of the series, Molly dealt with many situations in which her family embarrassed her on numerous occasions. Not alone in her perils, she had her best friend Mia (Vicki Davis) by her side who is madly in love with Molly's older brother Grant (Patrick Levis), who is a born-again Christian. Her oldest, self-absorbed brother Rick (Andrew W. Walker) constantly got into trouble.

Original series title
During the network's upfront presentation that season, the show was originally titled Maybe I'm Adopted, but following negative feedback, the show was re-titled. The show was unique in that it featured pop-up graphics on the screen, a concept originally proposed by Stan Rogow for another Disney-produced comedy series, Lizzie McGuire.

Cast

Main
 Julia Sweeney as Mary Stage
 Reagan Dale Neis as Molly Stage
 Patrick Levis as Grant Stage
 Ellen Albertini Dow as Grandma Harriet Krupp
 Andrew W. Walker as Rick Stage
 Daniella Canterman as Mindy Stage
 Deanna Canterman as Cindy Stage
 Vicki Davis as Mia
 Fred Willard as Jerry Stage

Recurring
 Dabbs Greer as Grandpa Fred Stage #1 (21 episodes)
 Walter Marsh as Grandpa Fred Stage (1 episode: Pilot)
 Shaun Sipos as Nick Gibson (8 episodes)
 Noah Bastian as Ben (6 episodes)

Episodes

References
 3. ^https://www.lukeford.net/profiles/profiles/stan_rogow.htm

External links
 
 

2000s American single-camera sitcoms
2000s American teen sitcoms
2001 American television series debuts
2002 American television series endings
English-language television shows
Television series about dysfunctional families
Television series about teenagers
Television series by ABC Studios
Television series by Warner Bros. Television Studios
Television shows filmed in Vancouver
Television shows set in Rhode Island
The WB original programming